

Station List

Ib - Ik

Im - In

Io - Is

It - Iz

I